Rather may refer to:
 Ratherius, bishop of Verona

Surname
 Dan Rather, news presenter
 Elizabeth Rather, expert in the computer programming language Forth
Susan Rather, character in 555 (1988 film)

See also
 would rather
 "Rather Be (disambiguation)" (song title)